Pseudophloeus fuscicornis is a species of beetle in the family Laemophloeidae, the only species in the genus Pseudophloeus.

References

Laemophloeidae